Elections were held in the Australian state of Queensland on 27 May 1972 to elect the 82 members of the Legislative Assembly of Queensland.

The Country-Liberal Coalition won its sixth consecutive victory since it won government in 1957 and also its second victory under Joh Bjelke-Petersen.

Key dates

Results

|}

Seats changing hands

 ¶ Results for Albert based on 1970 by-election
 Bill Heatley died in October 1971, but no by-election was called due to the proximity of the 1972 election.
 In addition, the Liberal Party retained Maryborough, which was won from Labor at the 1971 by-election.
 Aubigny, which was the last seat held by the Democratic Labor Party, was abolished at this election and its outgoing member, Les Diplock, retired.

Post-election pendulum

See also
 Members of the Queensland Legislative Assembly, 1969–1972
 Members of the Queensland Legislative Assembly, 1972–1974
 Candidates of the Queensland state election, 1972
 Bjelke-Petersen Ministry

References

Elections in Queensland
Queensland
1970s in Queensland
May 1972 events in Australia